WITR (89.7 FM) is a student-run broadcast radio station in Henrietta, New York. It is a college radio station, owned by the Rochester Institute of Technology. It was assigned the WITR call letters by the Federal Communications Commission.

WITR first went on the air as an AM station (600 kHz) in 1961, when RIT was still located in downtown Rochester. The station moved with the campus to Henrietta in 1968, and transitioned to FM in 1975.

The office and recording studios are located in the A-Level (basement) of the Student Alumni Union; in 2015 a new studio, Studio X, was constructed on the main floor of the Student Alumni Union. In March 2010, the station unveiled a new logo and branding, changing from "Modern Music and More" to "The Pulse of Music". On May 9, 2022, at 4 p.m., after stunting with a loop of "It's the End of the World as We Know It (And I Feel Fine)" by R.E.M., Christmas songs, and other musical styles, the station reverted back to the "Modern Music and More" format with a new curated music library, website, and logo.

WITR is marketed as an independent music station and broadcasts a variety of genres, in addition to its regularly-scheduled and typically automated indie music format. Weekly shows are produced in-studio by students and feature the following genres: world, hip-hop, R&B, rock, modern metal, hardcore, disco, house, jazz, ska, punk rock, Spanish/Latin, reggae, electronica, gospel, blues, news, classical, punk, and glam. In particular, the "Reggae Sounds" program is claimed to be the longest-running reggae program in North America.

WITR additionally broadcasts sporting events, including all RIT Tigers men's ice hockey games.

The station plans to upgrade from a 910-watt transmitter to 3,000 watts in summer 2022.

References

External links
WITR official website

ITR
Rochester Institute of Technology
Monroe County, New York
ITR
Radio stations established in 1975
1975 establishments in New York (state)